Envivio was a software-based video processing and delivery company. It was founded in 2000 in San Francisco by Julien Signes, the president and CEO. In 2015, the company was acquired by Ericsson. In 2019, Ericsson sold its television business unit to One Equity Partners, the resulting company is named MediaKind.

When founded, Envivio focused on developing technologies supported by the MPEG-4 standard, a standard for audio and video coding formats and related technology.

Envivio was headquartered in South San Francisco with offices in Singapore, Beijing, Denver (Colorado) and Rennes.

History 
Envivio was created in 2000 as a spin-off of the France Telecom R&D Labs in San Francisco and Rennes. The co-founders were contributors to the specification and development of MPEG-4, which is available on most consumer devices. The company holds 17 patents dating as far back as 2000. Envivio went public on April 25, 2012.

In September 2015, Envivio was bought by Ericsson Television.

A video from Envivio is used as an MPD steaming example in the dash.js open source DASH web player.

Products

Envivio products include encoders and transcodes, network media Processors, gateways and multiplexers, management systems, quality controls and platforms. The company has been a pioneer in software-based, over-the-top delivery to multiple screens.

In 2014, Envivio was contracted to provide 4K UHDTV coverage of the French Open for TDF, to assist Globosat in providing 4K coverage of the 2014 FIFA World Cup and also to provide the only live multi-screen coverage for Comcast, and to provide cloud-based video multiscreen transcoding services for Beijing Gehua CATV Network Co. using its Muse software.

See also

High Efficiency Video Coding
MPEG-2
H.264/MPEG-4 AVC
IPTV
HDMI

References

External links

PRISA TV
Software companies established in 2000
Software companies based in the San Francisco Bay Area
Companies formerly listed on the Nasdaq
Companies based in South San Francisco, California
2000 establishments in California
Ericsson
2012 initial public offerings
2015 mergers and acquisitions
American subsidiaries of foreign companies
Defunct software companies of the United States